{{Taxobox
| color = lightgrey
| name = Parviterribacter kavangonensis
| regnum = Bacteria
| phylum = Actinomycetota
| classis =Thermoleophilia
| ordo = Solirubrobacterales
| familia = Parviterribacteraceae
| genus = Parviterribacter
| species = P. kavangonensis'
| binomial = Parviterribacter kavangonensis| binomial_authority = Foesel et al. 2016
| type_strain = DSM 25205, LMG 26950, D16/0/H6
| subdivision = 
| synonyms = 
}}Parviterribacter kavangonensis is a  Gram-positive, non-spore-forming bacterium from the genus Parviterribacter'' which has been isolated from savannah soil in Kavango in Namibia.

References

 

Actinomycetota
Bacteria described in 2016